Piracanjuba River may refer to:

 Piracanjuba River (Corumbá River), a river in Brazil
 Piracanjuba River (Paranaíba River), a river in Brazil